Stella Chou (born 3 July 1956) is a Taiwanese journalist and politician.

Career
Chou studied journalism at Chinese Culture University and worked as a reporter for several television networks. She stood as a Kuomintang candidate for the 1989 Legislative Yuan elections, and was reelected in 1992. In August 1993, she became a founding member of the Chinese New Party, alongside Chen Kuei-miao, Jaw Shaw-kong, Lee Ching-hua, Wang Chien-shien, and Yok Mu-ming. Later that year, Chou coordinated New Party campaigns alongside Ju Gau-jeng. Chou contested the 1995 legislative elections, winning a third term. She sought New Party backing for a 1997 bid at the Taipei County magistracy, and left the New Party when it chose to nominate Yang Tai-shun. 
In 2002, business executive Su Hui-chen claimed that she bribed a legislative committee four years prior on which Chou was a member.

References

1956 births
Living people
Chinese Culture University alumni
20th-century Taiwanese women politicians
Taiwanese journalists
Taiwanese women journalists
Kuomintang Members of the Legislative Yuan in Taiwan
New Party Members of the Legislative Yuan
Members of the 1st Legislative Yuan in Taiwan
Members of the 2nd Legislative Yuan
Members of the 3rd Legislative Yuan
Politicians of the Republic of China on Taiwan from Tainan
New Taipei Members of the Legislative Yuan
Taipei Members of the Legislative Yuan
Taiwanese political party founders
21st-century Taiwanese women politicians
21st-century Taiwanese politicians
Taiwanese women founders